Rafael Arutyunyan (Harutyunyan; ; born July 5, 1957) is an Armenian-American figure skating coach. He has coached in Armenia, Russia and the United States.

Personal life 
Arutyunyan was born on July 5, 1957, in Tbilisi, Georgian SSR, and studied in Yerevan, Armenian SSR at the Armenian State Institute of Physical Culture. Arutyunyan's mother brought him to an ice rink after watching figure skating on television; he was skating regularly in Tbilisi by the age of seven. He is married to a skating coach, Vera, and moved to the United States in 2000. They have a son – a pianist born in the mid-1980s, and a daughter, who is an artist. On July 23, 2019, Arutyunyan and his wife became U.S. citizens.

Coaching career 
He coached young skaters in Yerevan from 1976. In the  1980–1981 season, one of his students, Saak Mkhitarian, became the Soviet junior champion and placed 6th at the World Junior Championships. Soviet officials then invited Arutyunyan to Moscow,  where he worked on his teaching certification and became an assistant to Tatiana Tarasova.

Around 2000 or 2001, Arutyunyan joined the Ice Castle International Training Center, in Lake Arrowhead, California. In August 2013, he relocated to the East West Ice Palace in Artesia, California. He collaborates with his wife, Vera Arutyunyan, and Nadezda Kanaeva. He moved to Lakewood ICE in Lakewood, California on June 25, 2016. In 2019, he took on the role of Head Coach for Higher Performance Team at Great Park Ice & Fivepoint Arena in Irvine, California.

His current students include:

 Nathan Chen  (2011 – present), 2022 Olympic Champion, 2018, 2019 and 2021 World champion, 2022 Olympic team silver medalist, 2018 Olympic team bronze medalist, 2017–2022 U.S. National Champion, 2017–2019 Grand Prix Final champion and 2017 4CC champion.
 Mandy Chiang 
 Hiu Ching Kwong 
 Stephen Gogolev  (June 2019 – present), 2019 Junior Grand Prix Final Champion
Ilia Malinin  2022 Junior World Champion, 2022 U.S. silver medalist, 2022 Grand Prix Final bronze medalist
 Andrea Montesinos Cantú  (2017 – present)
 Eric Sjoberg 
 Matthew Nielsen 
 Andrew Torgashev  (2020 - present)
 Alexa Knierim and Brandon Frazier , 2022 World Champions, 2022 Grand Prix Final silver medalists
 Camden Pulkinen  (May 2022 - present), 2018 U.S. Junior National Champion, 2017 Junior Grand Prix Final silver medalist
 Petr Gumennik  (2021 - present), 2023 Russian silver medalist

His former students include: 

 Mariah Bell  (August 2016 – October 2022), 2022 U.S. national champion.
 Michal Březina  (June 2016 – March 2022)
 Romain Ponsart  (August 2016 – March 2022)
 Taichi Honda  (March 2018 – 2021)
 Adam Rippon (September 2012 – March 2018), 2016 U.S. national champion. 2018 Winter Olympics U.S. Team bronze medalist.
 Ashley Wagner (June 2013 – March 2018), 2016 World silver medalist, 2014 Winter Olympics U.S. Team bronze medalist, and three-time U.S. national champion.
 Lim Eun-soo (April 2018 – September 2019)
 Alexander Abt  (13 years). 2003 Russian National Champion, 2002 European silver medalist, 1998 European bronze medalist
 Mao Asada  (summer 2006 to January 2008), 2010 Olympic silver medalist, 2008 World Champion, 2010 World Champion, 2014 World Champion, 4 x Grand Prix Final Champion (2006, 2009, 2013, 2014), 3x Four Continents Champion (2008, 2010, 2013), 6 x Japanese National Champion
 Marin Honda  (March 2018 – 2019), 2016 Junior World Champion, 2017 Junior World silver medalist
 Yudong Chen 
 Jeffrey Buttle  (2004-2008), 2006 Olympic bronze medalist, 2008 World Champion, 2004-2007 Canadian National Champion
 Sasha Cohen  (2009), 2006 Olympic silver medalist, 2004-2005 World silver medalist, 2006 US national champion
 Ivan Dinev
 Kiira Korpi (August 2013 – end of season)
 Michelle Kwan  (2003-2006), 5 x World Champion (1996, 1998, 2000, 2001, 2003), 1998 Olympic silver medalist, 2002 Olympic bronze medalist, 9 x U.S. National Champion (1996, 1998-2005)
 Vivian Le (June 2016 – December 2017)
 Hannah Miller (June 2015 – August 2016).
 Hovhannes Mkrtchyan
Audrey Shin
 Alexander Shubin
 Amy Lin
 Sergei Voronov (unknown – 2000)
 Ishkhan kirakosian

References

Armenian figure skaters
Figure skating coaches
Sportspeople from Tbilisi
1957 births
Living people
Soviet figure skaters
Georgian people of Armenian descent
People from Artesia, California
Armenian State Institute of Physical Culture and Sport alumni